Imagen is a Spanish language women's fashion magazine.

Imagen may also refer to:

 Imagen (Google Brain), a text-to-image machine learning model
 Imagen Televisión, a television network
 Imagen Awards
 Grupo Imagen, a Mexican media group